Matt Simon (born December 4, 1985) is an American football coach and former player who is currently the co-offensive coordinator and wide receivers coach at the University of Minnesota. He played college football at Northern Illinois University.

Playing career  
Despite being offered a preferred walk-on spot at Minnesota, Simon chose play wide receiver at Northern Illinois.

He signed with the New Orleans Saints after his career at Northern Illinois as an undrafted free agent, spending time on their practice squad for the 2009 and taking a year off, before rejoining them for the 2010 season.

Coaching career

Early coaching career 
After failing to make the Saints active roster in 2010, he joined the coaching staff at his alma mater Northern Illinois as an offensive quality control coach. He spent one season at the University of St. Thomas as a tight ends coach before joining the coaching staff at Rutgers.

Rutgers 
Simon joined the staff at Rutgers in 2012 as a player development coach. During his stint as a player development coach, Simon worked with the Scarlet Knights special teams unit. He was promoted to wide receivers coach in 2013,

Western Michigan 
Simon was named the wide receivers coach at Western Michigan in 2014, joining the coaching staff of P. J. Fleck, who was Simon's position coach for the last two seasons of Simon's playing career. During his time at Western Michigan, Simon was pivotal in the development of receiver Corey Davis, who set the NCAA Division I FBS record for most career receiving yards during his time at Western Michigan and was the highest NFL draft pick from Western Michigan.

Minnesota 
After Fleck was named the head coach at Minnesota, Simon joined Fleck's staff as the wide receivers coach. He added passing game coordinator to his duties for the 2019 season.  

After offensive coordinator Kirk Ciarrocca left to be the offensive coordinator at rival Penn State, Simon was named the interim offensive coordinator for the 2020 Outback Bowl against Auburn. Simon's performance as the offensive play-caller was praised by Fleck and others as the Gophers offense put up 494 total yards in the 31–24 victory.

After Mike Sanford Jr. was hired to be the Gophers offensive coordinator, Simon was promoted to co-offensive coordinator.

Personal life and education 
A native of Farmington, Minnesota, Simon attended Farmington High School, graduating in 2004. He graduated from Northern Illinois in 2008 with a degree in organizational management. During his break off from the NFL, Simon worked at an oil equipment rental company in Louisiana.

Simon married his wife Charlotte in July 2016. They have a son, Dean.

References

External links  
Minnesota Golden Gophers bio
Western Michigan Broncos bio

1985 births
Living people
People from Farmington, Minnesota
Players of American football from Minnesota
American football wide receivers
Northern Illinois Huskies football players
New Orleans Saints players
Northern Illinois Huskies football coaches
St. Thomas (Minnesota) Tommies football coaches
Rutgers Scarlet Knights football coaches
Western Michigan Broncos football coaches
Minnesota Golden Gophers football coaches